Henry Tanworth Wells  (14 December 1828 – 16 January 1903) was an English miniature and portrait painter. He was a member of the Pre-Raphaelite circle though he painted in the academic style.

His most popular painting was Victoria Regina, showing the young Queen Victoria receiving the news of her accession to the throne.

Biography

Wells was born in London on 14 December 1828, the only son of Henry Tanworth Wells (senior), a merchant, and his wife Charlotte Henman. He was baptised in St Pancras Old Church. They lived in Percy Street, St Pancras from 1838 to 1854. He was educated at Lancing College, Sussex.

Wells first met the artist Joanna Mary Boyce in Betws-y-Coed in north Wales in 1849, where she was studying under painter David Cox. He arranged to be introduced to Boyce in 1851, and asked her to marry him in 1855. She refused, saying she wanted to be free to "carry on her life's work". He pursued her, and they were engaged, but after her father's death, her mother persuaded her to change her mind, and Joanna gave the engagement ring back. Wells still did not give up, and despite social disapproval they continued to write to each other. They married on 9 December 1857. They had two daughters, Alice Joanna Street and Joanna Margaret Hadley. His wife Joanna died in childbirth after four years of marriage in 1861. Her brother was the Pre-Raphaelite painter George Price Boyce, so the marriage brought Wells into the group of friends that included Dante Gabriel Rossetti, Ford Madox Brown and John Ruskin.

Wells was trained as an artist in his teens, first being apprenticed to Messrs Dickinson as a draughtsman for lithographs in 1843 (aged 15), changing to miniature painting for the same firm. While working, he studied at J.M. Leigh's school during the evenings. He began to exhibit his work at the Royal Academy when he was only 18. In 1850 he went to Paris for six months to learn from the portrait painter Thomas Couture. When photography took over most of the market for miniature images, in 1861 Wells switched to painting portraits in oils, becoming known as the painter to choose for military groups. He also executed crayon portraits of individuals in society and politics.

His popular painting Victoria Regina, which depicts Victoria hearing that she had become Queen, was widely reproduced in prints and postcards during her reign. It exists in two versions: one exhibited at the Royal Academy in 1880 (now in the Tate Gallery) and a smaller one, with a different background, painted in 1887 and later presented to Edward VII (Royal Collection).

Wells was elected as a member of the Royal Academy on 30 June 1870.

He died at his home, Thorpe Lodge, on Campden Hill in Kensington on 16 January 1903 and was buried in Kensal Green cemetery.

Works

Among Wells' best known works are:

 Victoria Regina (1880, Tate Gallery)
 Volunteers at the Firing Point (1866, Royal Academy)
 The Queen and her Judges Opening the Royal Courts of Justice (1887, Government Art Collection)
 The Duke of Devonshire (1872, Iron and Steel Institute)
 Lord Chancellor Selborne (1874, Mercers' Company)

Permanent collections

Wells's works can be found in the major art collections of England:

 British Museum
 National Portrait Gallery
 Tate Gallery
 Royal Academy
 Royal Collection
 Government Art Collection
 National Trust Collections

References

Bibliography

 
 
 Oxford DNB: Wells, Henry Tanworth

External links

 
 Leicester Galleries: George Price Boyle: Alice Joanna Street
 Swanage Seen: Art Trail: Henry Tanworth Wells

1828 births
1903 deaths
19th-century English painters
English male painters
20th-century English painters
Miniature painting
Academic art
Artists' Rifles soldiers
Royal Academicians
20th-century English male artists
19th-century English male artists